The following is an alphabetical list of menhirs by subcontinents and nations.

Africa

Horn of Africa

Ancient standing stones are found throughout the Horn of Africa. Several of these old menhirs exist in Qohaito, Eritrea, and date to a period before the founding of the Kingdom of Axum. The Axumites themselves also erected a number of large stelae, which served a religious purpose in pre-Christian times. One of these granite columns is the largest such structure in the world, standing at 90 feet.

In northeastern Somalia, on the coastal plain 20 km to Alula's east are found ruins of an ancient monument in a platform style. The structure is formed by a rectangular drystone wall that is low in height; the space in between is filled with rubble and manually covered with small stones. Relatively large standing stones are also positioned on the edifice's corners. Near the platform are graves, which are outlined in stones. 24 m by 17 m in dimension, the structure is the largest of a string of ancient platform and enclosed platform monuments exclusive to far northeastern Somalia. Additionally, around 200 stone monuments (taalos) are found in the northeastern Botiala site, most of which consist of cairns. There are a number of rows of standing stones on the eastern side of the structures, which are similar to those at Salweyn, a great cairn-held situated close to Heis. Besides cairns, the Botiala area also features a few other drystone monuments. These include disc monuments with circular, ground-level features, as well as low, rectangular platform monuments. Burial sites near Burao in the northwestern part of the country likewise feature a number of old stelae.

Additionally, between Djibouti City and Loyada in Djibouti are a number of anthropomorphic and phallic stelae. The structures are associated with graves of rectangular shape flanked by vertical slabs, as also found in central Ethiopia. The Djibouti-Loyada stelae are of uncertain age, and some of them are adorned with a T-shaped emblem.

In Ethiopia, the town of Tiya contains 36 menhirs (standing stones) or stelae. Of these, 32 are engraved with swords and other mysterious symbols. The ancient structures suggest the presence of a large, prehistoric burial complex. The archaeological site was designated a World Heritage Site in 1980.

Asia

India

Menhirs are found all across India. They can be as tall as 20 to 14 feet (over 4.2 m), and several hundred smaller menhirs scattered all over the agricultural fields, mountains and various geographical areas. Rao and his team visited the menhir site in Telangana on the days of summer and winter solstice and equinox and found that particular rows of stones were aligned to the rising and setting sun on these days. "This suggests the megalithic community here was aware of the solar trajectories," he said.

Iran

Menhirs in Iran are found in different villages and areas of East Azarbaijan Province, meshkin shahr(pirazmian) and Amlash and Deylaman areas in Gilan. A double menhir is also situated on Kharg Island in the Persian Gulf.

Menhirs are called Sang-Afrāsht (سنگ‌افراشت) in Persian, and there are different studies published in Iranian periodicals about the details of the Iranian menhirs, specially in the periodical "Barrasiha-yi Tarikhi" (Historical studies).

Israel

The Hebrew term for "standing stone" is masseba, pl. massebot (also written matseva, matsevot). The most famous examples are from the Canaanite High Place at Tel Gezer, comprising a straight row of ten stone stelae and a square stone basin, all erected simultaneously during the Middle Bronze Age.

Indonesia

Menhirs are found in Indonesia, except for the easternmost tip, namely New Guinea, which are not found. One of the famous prehistoric sites in Indonesia, the Pahoman Site in Banten. At the Pahoman site there is a menhir stone which is strongly suspected of originating from the relics of Gunung Karang civilization which was inhabited by ancient Sundanese.

Europe

Armenia

Numerous menhirs dot the lands across Armenia, where they are called vishapakar. Vishap translates to "dragon" or "serpent" and kar translates to "stone". They are often found in the mountains near the sources of rivers or lakes. A large number of them have been carved in the shape of a fish. The earliest known vishapakar is thought to date from between the 18th to 16th centuries BC. An inscription in ancient Urartian cuneiform written upon a vishap at the temple of Garni shows that they were created prior to the Urartian Kingdom (pre-8th century).

Bulgaria

Several menhirs are known in Bulgaria: next to the museum in Haskovo, in the village of Ovcharovo, in the village of Pethocladentsi, in the village of Stegerovo, Staroseltsi village, in Strelcha.

Czech Republic

A number of menhirs exist in the Czech Republic. There are about 40 real menhirs in the country, and dozens of stones which could also be menhirs. Others have been erected recently. Czech menhirs are probably the last outcrop of similar buildings in northern Germany.

France

Brittany stands out in the distribution of menhirs by virtue of both the density of monuments and the diversity of types. The largest surviving menhir in the world is located in Locmariaquer, Brittany, and it is known as the Grand Menhir Brisé (Great Broken Menhir). It is placed third after the Thunder Stone in St. Petersburg and the Western Stone in the Western Wall as the heaviest object moved by humans without powered machinery.

A 4.5 meter menhir can be seen on the side of Le Mans Cathedral. It was moved there in 1778 when the dolmen it was associated with was destroyed.

Alignments of menhirs are common, the most famous being the Carnac stones in Brittany, where more than 3000 individual menhirs are arranged in four groups and arrayed in rows stretching across four kilometres. Each set is organised with the tallest stones at the western end and shorter ones at the eastern end. Some end with a semicircular cromlech, but many have since fallen or been destroyed.

The second largest concentration of menhirs in France is at the Cham des Bondons, which is located on high open limestone plain in the granitic Cévennes. Today, the site is protected by the Parc National des Cévennes. From the time pastoralism was established, the site was kept open by controlled burning and grazing.

On the island of Corsica, menhirs are found in Filitosa, a megalithic site in southern Corsica. The period of occupation spans from the end of the Neolithic era and the beginning of the Bronze Age, until around the Roman times in Corsica.

Ireland

Ireland is rich in menhirs, standing stones which are usually located in farmer's fields and are heavily worn due to poor weather conditions and exposure to livestock.

Italy

Menhirs are especially common in Sardinia. It is possible to see at least 332 such standing stones on the island, including especially elaborate "statue-menhirs" that show a human face at the top and other gendered symbols on the flat front sides. Over a hundred examples of this standardized type have been found, most of them around the village of Laconi.
In the Sardinian language they are known as perdas fittas or perdas lungas.

Norway

Overall 1,176 menhirs are registered in Norway. The stones are often included as part of a tomb construction. The introduction to Snorre Sagas points out that it was the custom to "burn all dead and raise monoliths for them" and that this custom was maintained in Norway and Sweden for a long time. As a rule, each grave was marked with a single stone, but there were also instances where several stones were used, including the burial facility De fem dårlige jomfruer at Karmsundet in Rogaland, with five raised stones. It is especially prevalent in Østlandet to find several monoliths arranged in a circle. 
Sometimes standing stone monuments are unrelated to known graves. It may be that they served as boundary markers. These include several stones in Fana, Bergen that can be linked to an important historical boundary between Sunnhordland and Nordhordland, as it was in medieval times.

In Norway, standing stones usually dated to the Migration Period, the Viking Age or early Middle Ages.

Portugal
In Portugal, there are also found several ancient menhirs. The highest concentration is in the Alentejo region. These include the menhirs of Meada, the largest of the Iberian Peninsula, Outeiro, Patalou and Barrocal. Among these megalithic structures is the great Almendres Menhir within the Almendres Cromlech complex near Évora.

Scandinavia

In Scandinavia, menhirs are called bautasteiner or bautastenar and continued to be erected during the Pre-Roman Iron Age and later, usually over the ashes of the dead. They were raised both as solitary stones and in formations, such as the stone ships and few stone circles. Sometimes, they were raised only as commemoration to great people, a tradition which was continued as the runestones.

Frostating, with its seat at Tinghaugen in Frosta municipality in the county of Nord-Trøndelag, was the site of an early Norwegian court. The site is represented by the Frostatinget bautasten.

The tradition was strongest in Bornholm, Gotland and Götaland and appears to have followed the Goths, during the 1st century, to the southern shore of the Baltic Sea, (now Northern Poland) where they are a characteristic of the Wielbark culture.

Serbia
The graves of the "Latins" and the "Jidovs" near the village of Balwan (Bovan), north of Aleksinac in Serbia were marked by large boulders.

Spain
In Spain, menhirs associated with the western European megalithic industry are relatively unusual compared to dolmens, but still are common sights in the northern half of the country, where at least 500 menhirs have been reported. They are particularly common in the Basque Country, Navarre, northern Burgos and Palencia, Cantabria, and the Pyrenees, where they are usually encountered standing alone or in small groups (cromlech) in elevated locations; the Arlobi menhir is one of the most recent examples of a menhir. In smaller numbers, but of great dimensions, some examples are located in Extremadura, very related to the menhirs of Portugal. Most of the menhirs in northern Spain appear to date back to the stone age; they are not usually associated with burials, but in at least one instance (the Menhir of Cuesta del Molino in Burgos) burials dating at least 2000 years after the menhir was originally built have been found.

In mediterranean Spain and, particularly the Balearic islands, megalithic structures consisting of standing stones such as the Taulas, but associated with Bronze Age and Iron Age cultures, are also common.

Sweden

In Sweden menhirs were erected as markers for the graves of warriors until the 13th century. The following lines are taken from Snorri Sturluson's introduction to his work Heimskringla:

In the same work Snorri writes that the Swedes burned the corpse of their king Vanlade and raised a stone over his ashes by the River Skyt, one of the tributaries of the River Fyris:

The tradition is also mentioned in the Hávamál.

Switzerland
In the French-speaking canton of Vaud in Switzerland, several menhirs form linear patterns in Yverdon-les-Bains. These are situated in Clendy and date back to the third millennium BC.

Wales

In Welsh, menhirs are called 'Maen Hir' and they are scattered throughout Wales.

South America

Menhirs were erected by the U'wa people of Colombia in their ancestral territory. They believe that the menhirs are the ancients of the U'wa clans who were turned into the stone piers of the world. Menhirs can be found in Chita and Chiscas, Boyacá.

There are 114 menhirs in the Provincial Park Los Menhires in Argentina. They were erected by the Tafí people, an indigenous culture of Tucumán province, and were used in fertility rites.

See also 
 List of dolmens

Notes

References
Le Roux, C. T. 1992. "The Art of Gavrinis Presented in its Armorican Context and in Comparison with Ireland." in Journal of the Royal Society of Antiquaries of Ireland vol. 122, pp 79–108.

External links

Dolmens, Menhirs & Stones-Circles in the South of France – Menhirs of the "Cham des Bondons"
New Theory – Henges – Engineering in Prehistory
Rows of menhirs in Russia, South Ural
List of menhirs and their related stories in Czech Republic
Ancient Europe Placemarks Google Earth file downloads.
Skela menhirs in Ukraine 

Menhirs